The People's Revolutionary Militia (French: Milice Révolutionnaire Populaire), was the militia force created by the New Jewel Movement (NJM) after it seized power to provide local security against sabotage, involve masses in political action and provide a 5,000 member reserve force for the People's Revolutionary Army (PRA). Due to equipment shortages and administrative failings, many PRM members never received uniforms or weapons training. The best trained of the militia units were the Rapid Mobilisation Companies, one of which was provided for each PRA Defence Region.

Shortly after the overthrow and execution Maurice Bishop, the People's Revolutionary Militia began arming some of its members for civil war.

Notes

References

External links 
The Grenada Revolution Online – What was the PRA, PRAF and PRM?

Communism in Grenada
Paramilitary organisations based in Grenada